Dexter's Laboratory: Ego Trip is an animated television special based on the Cartoon Network animated television series Dexter's Laboratory. It was produced by Hanna-Barbera Cartoons and originally aired on December 10, 1999. The special follows Dexter, the series' protagonist, as he travels forward through time and meets futuristic versions of himself and his rival Mandark.

While made for television, the film is the directorial debut of series creator Genndy Tartakovsky and was originally intended to conclude the series. Ego Trip was the first Cartoon Network television movie produced, and is the final Dexter's Laboratory installment to be animated using traditional cel animation. This is one of the final times Christine Cavanaugh reprises her role as Dexter; Candi Milo would replace her beginning in the third season.

Plot

After chasing his rival Mandark out of his lab when he tries to steal his latest invention, the Neurotomic Protocore, an energy source that also draws on and distributes the brainpower of its user, Dexter asks his sister Dee Dee to leave the lab, where she unintentionally enters a time machine stored near the entrance. Suddenly, Dexter is confronted with a group of red robots that have appeared from this time machine. They declare that they are here to "destroy the one who saved the future" and appear to make ready to attack Dexter. Dexter easily destroys them with the use of various tools and gadgets from his lab, as the robots mysteriously don't attack at all. Believing that he is "The One Who Saved the Future" that the robots spoke of, Dexter decides to travel through time to discover how "cool" he becomes.

However, in the first time period he visits, Dexter finds a tall, skinny, weak version of himself (known only as "Number Twelve") working in an office designing cubicles – and Mandark is his rich, successful – and sadistically abusive – boss. The kid Dexter berates his older self for allowing Mandark to bully him around and manages to convince him to come along to see how cool they become, but unwittingly leaves the Neurotomic Protocore and its related blueprints out in his cubicle, which Mandark steals as the two Dexters move forward in time.

In the second time period, all the technology from the blueprints has been implemented, creating a utopian society of science and knowledge where anything can be materialized through the power of the Core.  The two Dexters meet their much older self, a wizened senior citizen Dexter about the same height as the kid Dexter who is responsible for bringing the world into this new age with his brainpower (and Mandark's brain in a vat who cannot do anything other than complain about his situation).  Due to his advanced age, however, Old Man Dexter can't remember anything about how he saved the world, so they travel back in time to find out.

In this final time period, which takes place between the first and second time periods, they find a dystopic world where everyone is stupid and fire and technology are forbidden, controlled by overlord Mandark thanks to the Neurotomic Protocore. They meet action hero Dexter, who is tall, muscular and bald, fighting Mandark's evil robots. Action Hero Dexter explains that he and Mandark had been employed as corporate research scientists many years ago, where a jealous Mandark, unable to come up with the ideas Dexter could, stole them and passed them off as his own, using them to rise through the ranks and eventually take over the company in a coup – turning Dexter into the weak, cowardly, cubicle-designing Twelve.

Eventually, Mandark got a hold of the Neurotomic Protocore (due to Twelve's mistake in leaving it out in his cubicle) and attempted to harness its power, but set the core's positive flow to negative due to his incompetence with it, twisting his already evil mind. As the Core's now negative energies slowly swept over the world, they gradually numbed the minds of the population and allowed him to take over the world, hoarding all science and knowledge for himself. Dexter, no longer able to stand being enslaved and determined to stop Mandark, spent years digging underground to escape Mandark's tower, growing into his Action Hero persona in the process. By the time he emerged, the world was in its current state.

The four Dexters, determined to end Mandark's oppressive rule once and for all, go back to their ruined laboratory and use its resources to build a giant robot to invade his fortress. They manage to fight their way in – though the robot is destroyed in the process – and confront Overlord Mandark, now morbidly obese with brain matter, with his only form of locomotion being carried around his lair by a hook-and-winch. Outnumbered, Mandark evens the playing field by summoning his three selves from the other time periods to help him defeat the Dexters. A battle royal ensues, with each Dexter fighting the Mandark of their respective time period. Twelve eventually stands up to his Mandark who he defeats before rallying the other Dexters to reach the Core's controls.

The fight ends in a stalemate, both groups restraining each other from pressing the Core's main button; however, Dee Dee emerges from the time machine welded into the Dexters’ now-destroyed robot. With her sudden presence confusing the Dexters and distracting the Mandarks, no one able to stop her as she – driven by her habit of seeing what buttons do – presses it herself.

With the positive flow of the Neurotomic Protocore restored, the world's intelligence returns to normal and causes Mandark's three time-displaced selves to be sent back to their own time periods, his head to burst open with only his brain intact, and his fortress to collapse. However, the Dexters, realizing in anger that Dee Dee was "the one who saved the future," create a group of five robots from the rubble to get revenge on her for inadvertently taking away their triumph.  The kid Dexter commands them to "destroy the one who saved the future" before sending them back to the past, unwittingly setting the whole series of events in motion himself.

The Dexters return to their original time periods. The kid Dexter returns shortly before he originally left, and sees himself fighting the robots he just built with his other selves. Realizing the time loop he has created (or rather that he has come back too far back to before he ever left), Dexter becomes confused when he attempts to wrap his head around it all but ultimately decides to ignore it and goes to eat a sandwich. When Dee Dee – who had already used the time machine to return home after saving the future – shows up, Dexter gathers up his food and walks away, still angry. Unaware of what she did, Dee Dee is left to shrug at the audience in a confused manner, as the movie draws to an end.

Release 
Ego Trip first aired on Cartoon Network on December 10, 1999, and re-aired on New Year's Day 2000. It was eventually seen on Boomerang in the 2010s. This movie has not been in reruns ever since.

The special was released on VHS & Video CD in Region 1 on November 7, 2000, and VHS in Region 2 on July 23, 2001. The VHS also includes the episodes "The Justice Friends: Krunk's Date" and "Dial M for Monkey: Rasslor". The film is included in the region 4 DVD release Dexter's Laboratory: Collected Experiments.

Reception 
Marc Bernardin of Entertainment Weekly called Ego Trip "drawn-out", saying that Dexter's Laboratory does not do as well in an hour-long format as it does in normal television episodes. Christine Cavanaugh, the voice actor for Dexter, received an Annie Award in 2000 for the category "Outstanding Individual Achievement for Voice Acting by a Female Performer in an Animated Television Production" for her role in the movie.

References

External links 

 
 

1999 television films
1999 films
1999 science fiction films
1999 television specials
1990s animated television specials
American animated television films
American children's animated comic science fiction films
Animated films about time travel
Dexter's Laboratory
American dystopian films
Films directed by Genndy Tartakovsky
Films produced by Genndy Tartakovsky
Films with screenplays by Genndy Tartakovsky
1999 animated films
1990s American animated films
Animated films set in the future
Science fiction television specials
Animated films about children
Films with screenplays by Paul Rudish
Films with screenplays by Craig McCracken
Films with screenplays by Amy Keating Rogers